David Wingate may refer to:

 David Wingate (basketball) (born 1963), retired American basketball player
 David Wingate (poet) (1828–1892), Scottish poet and miner
 David Robert Wingate (1819–1899), industrialist
 David B. Wingate (born 1935), conservationist and naturalist